Irmakköy can refer to:

 Irmakköy, Cide
 Irmakköy, İspir